Andrea Brühlmann (born 18 January 1984) is a Swiss sport shooter.

She participated at the 2018 ISSF World Shooting Championships, winning a medal.

References

External links

Living people
1984 births
Swiss female sport shooters
ISSF rifle shooters
People from Arbon
Sportspeople from Thurgau
21st-century Swiss women